The Korean Coast Guard (KCG; ; Hanja: 海洋警察廳, Revised Romanization: Haeyang-gyeongchal-cheong, literally Maritime Police Agency) is a South Korean law enforcement sub-agency responsible for maritime safety and control off the coast. The KCG is an independent and external branch of Ministry of Maritime Affairs and Fisheries.

The KCG has its headquarters in Incheon, has hundreds of smaller operating stations along the coastline of the Korean Peninsula. It operates 4 classes of heavy vessels (over 1000 tons), 3 classes of medium vessels (over 250 tons), and 3 classes of light vessels (speedboats over 30 tons). The KCG also uses several types of 'special purpose watercraft', such as firefighting vessels, barges, high-speed scout boats, light patrols, and amphibious hovercraft. The KCG aviation unit fields 6 fixed-wing aircraft and 16 rotary-wing aircraft. The Coast Guard also had its own asymmetric warfare unit named the 'Korean Coast Guard Special Operation Unit'.

History

The Coast Guard Authority was formed on 23 December 1953 in Pusan(Busan), at the same time a Maritime Police Unit was also established as part of the National Police Agency. In October 1962, new bases were established in Incheon, Yeosu, Pohang, and Kunsan(Gunsan). In February 1963, the aviation unit of the KCG closed, though it reopened in the 1980s. From 1980 onwards, the KCG greatly expanded its fleet, and in August 1991, the Police Unit was renamed the Korea National Maritime Police Agency. In 2007 the Korea National Maritime Police Agency was integrated into the Coast Guard. In the early 21st century, the fleet expanded to include various vessels of over 3,000 tons, and as of January 2002, the 'Korean Coast Guard Special Operation Unit' was officially formed. In the May 2008, the "Search & Rescue Maintenance Unit" was newly constructed, and as of late 2008, various sub-agencies changed infrastructural composition. Before its disestablishment the Korean Coast Guard had planned to field more vessels over 5000 tons by 2015, and to significantly expand its asymmetric warfare force through encouraging participation from other police branches.

Disestablishment

On May 18, 2014, President Park Geun-hye announced South Korea's "plans to break up its coastguard" after failing to respond well during the MV Sewol ferry disaster. According to Park, "investigation and information roles would be transferred to the South Korea National Police while the rescue and salvage operation and ocean security roles would be transferred to the Department for National Safety, not to be confused with the Korean Ministry of Security and Public Administration, which will be newly established".

On November 7, 2014, the National Assembly declared that the South Korean Coast Guard be disbanded as a result of South Korean lawmakers voting 146 to 71 in favor of transferring the Coast Guard's investigative responsibilities to the South Korea National Police Agency and establishing a broader safety agency. As a result, the South Korean Coast Guard is again under the Ministry of Public Safety and Security.

Resurrection

Newly elected President Moon Jae-in announced his plan to re-organise the ministries and government agencies. Following the approval of the National Assembly, the Korean Coast Guard was revived on July 26, 2017 as an independent, external agency under the Ministry of Oceans and Fisheries.

Goals
(From the English home page of the Korean Coast Guard)
 Develop and maintain operational capability to ensure national maritime sovereignty.
 Be recognized by the nation as the guardian of maritime security.
 Become the foremost maritime security agency in Northeast Asia.
 Develop and improve the ability to respond to maritime search and rescue requirements throughout the area of responsibility.
 Develop and improve the ability to preserve and protect the maritime environment.
 Be fully responsive to public requests for administrative services.
 Continually improve the organization and operation of the agency.

Main Duties
(From the English home page of the Korean Coast Guard)
 1. Search and Rescue
Korean Coast Guard performs to respond speedy and effective rescue activities in order to save a precious life and to protect property when it occurred maritime accidents.
 2. Maritime Security
Korean Coast Guard ensures to protect sea from maritime crime and keep maritime security and peace.
 3. Marine Environmental Protection
Korean Coast Guard has always been in the forefront for surveillance of marine pollution and prevention of hazardous spills in order to keep waters clean and to preserve abundant marine resources.
 4. International Affairs
We, Korea Coast Guard, always do our best to respond quickly against international maritime crimes including enforcement of Alien Migrant Interdiction by seizing current tendency of international crime.
 5. Maritime Traffic Safety Management
Korean Coast Guard provides an unlimited protection to secure maritime tourism, safe marine recreational activities, and to keep people from any kind of potential dangers and barriers.
 6. Maritime Pollution Response
Korean Coast Guard performs to build a clean maritime environment through prevention activities thoroughly against hazardous spills or discharge and perfect pollution control.

Equipment

Aircraft
These are quoted from "Korean Coast Guard 2012 White Paper"

List of ships of the Republic of Korean Coast Guard
These are quoted from "Naver 블로그 지식의 수집광"

Charter of the Republic of Korean Coast Guard
(From the English home page of the Korean Coast Guard)
 "We are the proud Korean Coast Guard to secure our own sea by inheriting a spirit and a tradition of the marine nation. We are charged with the historical mission to protect freedom and interest of the public, and pursue peace and prosperity of Nation, furthermore, makes contribution to the peace of the world. Therefore, we pledge to accomplish our assigned duties and clarify the KCG's direction."
 We are a devoted Coast Guard undaunted by any affliction as a leading protagonist of the maritime security
  We are a righteous Coast Guard who properly administers the law according to the own conscience as the symbol of the law and justice.
  We are a global Coast Guard who maintains international maritime order and conserves a sea which is mutual asset among all nations.
  We are a growing Coast Guard who aims for the future by developing the knowledge and ability with the creative attitude.

Command
Formerly called Korea Maritime Police, is led by a Commissioner of the KCG and a deputy Commissioner.

The KCG is divided into six Bureaus and 23 Divisions. There are 16 KCG stations with 74 branch offices and 245 subagencies.

Other related agencies include:
 KCG Academy
 KCG R&D Center
 KCG Maintenance Agency

Fleet
 Patrol Boats
 Law Enforcement Craft
 Pollution Response Boats
 Aircraft
 Search and Rescue Craft

References

External links

  
 Korean Coast Guard 122 Rescue Unit official website 

Law enforcement in South Korea
Military units and formations disestablished in 2014
Marine occupations
Coast guards